The Marton Oak is a large, ancient sessile oak (Quercus petraea) which grows in the village of Marton, Cheshire. The tree is believed to be 1,200 years old, and is thought to be in the latter stages of its lifespan, as most of the heartwood has rotted away. The tree split into sections centuries ago, but they have one and the same root system. It is not known what the tree looked like before it split.

Health

Splitting is common in ancient sessile and pedunculate oaks, and poses no immediate health risk to the tree.

Location and status

The tree grows on private land. Permission must be sought from the owner before the tree can be viewed. The oak has been registered as a Heritage Tree, a Tree of National Special Interest, one of the 50 Great British Trees selected in 2002, and is designated a UK champion tree for girth.

References 

Individual oak trees
Individual trees in England